The Enbridge Northern Gateway Pipelines were a project to build a twin pipeline from Bruderheim, Alberta, to Kitimat, British Columbia. The eastbound pipeline would have imported natural gas condensate and the westbound pipeline would have exported diluted bitumen from the Athabasca oil sands to a marine terminal in Kitimat for transportation to Asian markets via oil tankers. The project would have also included terminal facilities with "integrated marine infrastructure at tidewater to accommodate loading and unloading of oil and condensate tankers, and marine transportation of oil and condensate." The  project was proposed in mid-2000s and has been postponed several times. The proposed project would have been developed by Enbridge Inc., a Canadian crude oil and liquids pipeline and storage company.

When completed, the pipeline and terminal would have provided 104 permanent operating positions created within the company and 113 positions with the associated marine services. First Nations groups, many municipalities, including the Union of BC Municipalities, environmentalists and oil sands opponents, among others, denounced the project because of the environmental, economic, social and cultural risks posed by the pipeline. Proponents argued that the pipeline would have provided Indigenous communities with equity ownership, employment, community trust and stewardship programs. The Federal Court of Appeal ultimately ruled that consultation with First Nations was inadequate and overturned the approval.

The proposal was heavily criticized by Indigenous peoples. Groups like the Yinka Dene Alliance organized to campaign against the project. In December 2010, 66 First Nations bands in British Columbia, including many along the proposed pipeline route, signed the Save the Fraser Declaration in opposition to the project, and 40 more signed since that time. The proposal was also opposed by numerous non-governmental organizations, which cite previous spills  and concerns over oil sands expansion and associated risks in transportation.

In June 2014 the Northern Gateway pipeline project was approved by the federal government, subject to 209 conditions. The CBC questioned the silence concerning the Northern Gateway project and suggested that Enbridge might have quietly shelved the project. Upon taking office in 2015, Prime Minister of Canada Justin Trudeau banned oil tanker traffic on the north coast of British Columbia, effectively killing the project. On 29 November 2016 Trudeau officially rejected plans for the pipeline.

History
The project was proposed in the mid-2000s and was postponed several times. It was announced in 2006. Enbridge signed a cooperation agreement with PetroChina in 2005 to ensure the utilization of pipeline capacity. PetroChina agreed to buy about  transported through the pipeline. In 2007, however, PetroChina withdrew from the projects because of delays in starting the project.

On 4 December 2009, Canada's National Energy Board (NEB) and the Canadian Environmental Assessment Agency (CEAA) issued the Joint Review Panel Agreement and the terms of reference for the environmental and regulatory review of the Northern Gateway Pipelines.

Enbridge Northern Gateway submitted its project application to the National Energy Board on 27 May 2010. The eight-volume regulatory application was assessed by a Joint Review Panel (JRP) established by the Canadian Environmental Assessment Agency (CEAA) and the National Energy Board (NEB).  On 19 January 2011, the JRP requested that Enbridge provide additional information on the design and risk assessment of the pipelines due to the difficult access and unique geographic location of the proposed project.

On 17 June 2014 the Canadian government accepted the project's proposal. It set out 209 conditions, identified in 2013 by a Joint Review Panel, to be resolved during the next phase of the regulatory process.

On 6 May 2016, Enbridge filed a request with the National Energy Board to extend the sunset clause for the Northern Gateway Project.
The sunset clause (NEB Condition No. 2) stipulated that construction had to begin before 31 December 2016.

Technical description
Crude oil produced from oil sands would have been transported from Bruderheim to Kitimat, while natural gas condensate would have moved in the opposite direction. Condensate would have been used as a diluent in oil refining to decrease the viscosity of heavy crude oil from oil sands, and to make it easier to transport by pipelines. In 2008 Enbridge expected these pipelines to be completed by 2015. The project, including a marine terminal in Kitimat, was expected to cost . The Kitimat terminal would have comprised two tanker berth platforms, one serving very large crude carriers and another serving Suezmax-type condensate tankers. The terminal would have included oil and condensate tanks and a pump station.

Environmental assessment
As an inter-provincial pipeline, the project required a public regulatory review process conducted by JRP.  The JRP provided a joint environmental assessment and regulatory process that contributed to decision making.  The first session of JRP was held  on 10 January 2012, in Kitamaat Village, British Columbia.

Other types of studies, such as socioeconomic assessments, were also necessary prior to project approval.

Competing projects
Kinder Morgan Energy Partners operates the  Trans Mountain Pipeline System from Edmonton, Alberta, to terminals and refineries in central British Columbia, the Vancouver area and the Puget Sound region in Washington. According to Kinder Morgan, expanding the existing pipeline would have been cheaper than Northern Gateway and avoided opposition as experienced by the Enbridge's project.

As an alternative, some indigenous groups proposed Eagle Spirit Pipeline from northern Alberta to the Prince Rupert area on the BC coasts. Many indigenous people wanted the economic activity from construction and operation of pipelines to improve conditions of their members.

Another project to export crude oil from western Canada was the XL expansion of TransCanada's Keystone pipeline. which supplies heavy oil to refineries on the US Gulf Coast.

And the Energy East pipeline would have transported oil to refineries in Montreal and the Atlantic provinces, which now import oil from the Bakken formation in Montana and North Dakota by railway, as well as from overseas by ship. However, project proponent TC Energy cancelled the pipeline in the face of political objections and concerns over economic viability.

Opposition

BC NDP
BC NDP leader Adrian Dix promised to pull B.C. out of the federal review process if he was elected in the spring of 2013 (which he was not), while also hiring prominent constitutional lawyer Murray Rankin to consider a legal challenge on who has jurisdiction over pipelines.  Rankin argues that British Columbia should withdraw from the federal government's Pipelines review process and set up a made-in-B.C. environmental assessment.  In an August 2012 NDP press conference Rankin argued that a made-in-B.C. review would ensure that B.C.’s economic, social and environmental interests are fully addressed, that B.C.'s powers and responsibilities are properly exercised and that First Nations’ interests are recognized within the new process.  In response Dix said ""Within a week of taking office, we will serve the federal government with 30 days’ notice to terminate the 2010 deal in which the Liberals signed away B.C.’s interests."

This policy has been blamed for the poor election result for the NDP in 2013. The NDP won nearly every coastal riding in the 2013 British Columbia general election - so it could be argued that there is a division between those who live in the path of potential environmental harm, and those who live away from the area. The NDP had been seen as the heavy favourites, until shortly after they clarified their pipeline policy.

First Nations/Aboriginal groups
Aboriginal groups' main concern was that the pipeline might spill and pollute the Fraser River. Many Aboriginal groups opposed the Northern Gateway pipeline proposal, though some others signed agreements supporting it. Enbridge and some Aboriginal groups disagreed on the extent of this support and opposition.  Several coalitions and alliances produced formal declarations unequivocally rejecting the intrusion of an oil pipeline on aboriginal lands. These included Yinka Dene Alliance, Heiltsuk Nation, Coastal First Nations, and Save the Fraser.  The Wet'suwet'en First Nation opposed the pipeline, as well as many Dakelh First Nations including the Saik'uz First Nation.

The Joint Review Panel travelled to the Heiltsuk Nation in April 2012 for hearings into the Enbridge Northern Gateway Pipeline proposal. "By some counts, a third of Bella Bella's 1,095 residents were on the street that day, one of the largest demonstrations in the community's history." Facing non-violent protest as part of the greeting at the airport, the JRP members suspended the hearings for a day and a half. While the hearings did resume, substantial time had been lost, meaning fewer people could present to the JRP than had planned.

"As the young people of the community explained when they finally got the chance, their health and identity were inextricably bound up in their ability to follow in the footsteps of their forebears - fishing and paddling in the same waters, collecting kelp in the same tidal zones in the outer coastal islands, hunting in the same forests, and collecting medicines in the same meadows. Which is why Northern Gateway was seen not simply as a threat to the local fishery but as the possible undoing of all this intergenerational healing work. And therefore as another wave of colonial violence."

Environmental advocates
The Dogwood Initiative, ForestEthics, the International League of Conservation Photographers, and Greenpeace Canada were some organizations that actively campaigned against the Enbridge pipeline proposal.

Issues

Impact on Indigenous peoples
The proposal was opposed by Indigenous groups. Groups like the Yinka Dene Alliance were organized to campaign against the project. First Nations bands in British Columbia, including many along the proposed pipeline route, signed the Save-the-Fraser Declaration in opposition to the project.

The Save-the-Fraser Declaration was signed by numerous indigenous tribes, declaring opposition to oil pipelines through First Nation traditional territories. It was signed by more than 130 First Nations.

In 2013 Enbridge offered a 10% equity stake in the $5.5 billion proposed project, over the following 30 years, to participating aboriginal groups. As well, Enbridge said it would put one per cent of Northern Gateway's pre-tax earnings into a trust, which was expected to generate $100 million over 30 years for non-Aboriginal as well as Aboriginal groups. The company said it expected roughly 15 per cent of the proposed project's construction labour force to be aboriginal.

In 2012, without naming individual bands, Enbridge said that 70% of the affected First Nations had signed onto the deal. However, no band whose land was being directly traversed by the pipeline had signed on.

Enbridge offerings were expected to create more division amongst first nations, as was the case with Enbridge's announcement in 2011 of support by the Gitxan hereditary chiefs, in exchange for $7 million.  However, this deal was quickly overturned following the closure of the Gitxsan Treaty Society Office by opponents of the deal. The Enbridge deal was subsequently rejected in writing by 45 Gitxsan chiefs, who claimed that the office had misrepresented the Gitxsan people. Only one chief in BC publicly supported the proposed pipeline, Chief Elmer Derrick. Derrick was the chief negotiator for the Gitxsan Treaty Society before its closure in 2011. Derrick was later dismissed as chief negotiator for the GTS.

Several First Nations (including the Haisla, Gitga'at, Haida, Gitxaala, Wet'suwet’en, Nadleh Whut'en, Nak'azdli, and Takla Lake) publicly stated (via the Joint Review Panel or in the media) that neither the Crown nor the established assessment process for Enbridge's project had adequately met their duty to consult and accommodate, or respect their Aboriginal rights and title.

Impact on economy
Wright Mansell Research Ltd, in their analysis of the project, concluded that the project "would be a catalyst for the generation of substantial and widely distributed economic stimulus for Canada and a significant contributor to sustaining Canadian growth and prosperity for many years into the future. While the benefits of greater flexibility, adaptability and opportunity for the Canadian petroleum sector, through market expansion and diversification, have not been quantified, they are also real and important. Further, the cost benefit analysis indicates that, taking into account all benefits and costs, including cost expectations from oil spills, there is a large and robust net social benefit associated with the project from a national Canadian perspective."

A report put forth by economist and former Insurance Corporation of BC CEO, Robyn Allan, in early 2012, took assumptions of Wright Mansell Research Ltd's analysis into question stating that this proposed pipeline could have actually hurt non-oil based sectors of the Canadian economy. Allan stated in the report that the project's success depended on continual yearly oil price increases, by about $3/barrel.  She also stated that an increase in oil prices would have led to "a decrease in family purchasing power, higher prices for industries who use oil as an input into their production process, higher rates of unemployment in non-oil industry related sectors, a decline in real GDP, a decline in government revenues, an increase in inflation, an increase in interest rates and further appreciation of the Canadian dollar."

Tanker moratorium in British Columbia
There has been an informal moratorium on large tanker traffic in Dixon Entrance, Hecate Strait, and the Queen Charlotte Sound since 1972.  Since then, the federal and provincial governments have commissioned periodic studies to reassess whether to lift the tanker moratorium. Each study has concluded that the risk of tanker spills is too high. In 2003–2004, the federal government initiated a three-part review process, including a scientific review by the Royal Society of Canada (the RSC report), a First Nations engagement process (the Brooks Report), and a public review process (the Priddle Panel). The RSC report concluded that "the present restriction on tanker traffic along the West Coast of British Columbia should be maintained for the time being"

In 2009, the Canadian government's position was that there is no moratorium on tanker traffic in the coast waters of British Columbia.  
However, on 7 December 2010, Canada's environmental watchdog  (Scott Vaughan, commissioner of the environment and sustainable development) in a damning report stated "Canada's government is not ready to handle a major oil spill from a tanker, in part because its emergency response plan is out of date".

In December 2010, the federal House of Commons passed a non-binding motion to ban bulk oil tanker traffic in the Dixon Entrance, Hecate Strait and Queen Charlotte Sound.

In November 2015, Prime Minister Trudeau's mandate letter to the Minister of Transport directed that the moratorium be formalized.

Enbridge's history of incidents
The proposed pipeline was criticized by several entities, including government and non-governmental organizations (NGOs), the BC NDP and independent sources, citing Enbridge's spotty history with pipeline installation, non-conformance to government regulations  and numerous spills.

 2013 in June. The Canadian National Energy Board forced Enbridge to publish safety measures in place at 125 of its pumping stations.  The response said that 117 of 125 pumping stations were in non-compliance to safety rules set out by the NEB.  The NEB rules broken included lack of backup power at all but 8 stations and no emergency shutdown at 83 of its pump stations.
 2012 In July, 190,000 liters of crude oil spilled in Wisconsin.  This followed a 230,000-litre leak near Red Deer, Alberta, a month before.
 2011 On the first day of the public hearings into the company's planned Northern Gateway pipeline, U.S. pipeline regulators informed Enbridge of the leak from its Stingray Pipeline. Enbridge said they could continue operations at the Stingray Pipeline, which was carrying up to 560 million cubic feet a day of natural gas from offshore wells in the Gulf of Mexico. Bubbles from the pipeline leak were observed about 100 kilometres from the Louisiana coast.

 2008 Pipeline installation in Wisconsin, where over 500 regulatory violations were incurred in one year of construction. Enbridge also had over 600 recorded leaks and breaks over the previous 10 years.

The Pembina Institute published a report in 2010 saying that the pipeline would have adverse impacts on land, air, and water.  Some of Enbridge's shareholders asked the company to investigate the unique risks and liabilities associated with the project.

 1991 A Lakehead (now Enbridge) crude oil pipeline near Grand Rapids, Minnesota, ruptured on 2 March. About  of oil had spilled from that pipeline from the early 1970s to 1991, per Minnesota records. A resident in the area noticed the smell of oil and alerted the local fire department. Approximately 300 people living in homes near the site were evacuated for safety, but were allowed to return to their homes later in the night.
 1979 A  diameter Lakehead (now Enbridge) pipeline ruptured near Bemidji, Minnesota, leaking  of crude oil on 20 August. The pipeline company initially recovers 60 percent of the spilled oil. Later in 1988, the Minnesota Pollution Control Agency required Lakehead to extract more oil using new technology; removal continued on, with studies still underway in the area.

Public opinion
Multiple public opinion surveys, sponsored by Enbridge, Ethical Oil and other oil interests, were conducted on the Northern Gateway pipeline. An Abacus Data survey released in January 2012 for Sun Media found that 38% of Canadians were in support of building the pipeline, while 29% were opposed.  Another 33% said they neither support nor oppose the pipeline.

Another survey conducted by Forum Research in mid-January 2012 found that the share of Canadians who opposed the pipeline had fallen to 43%, from 51% in a December survey. Support for the project remained stable (at 37%, up within margin of error from 35%). 20% were undecided (up from 15% in December).

In British Columbia, a March 2012 survey by Mustel Group reported increased opposition to the Enbridge proposal. In their B.C.-wide telephone survey sponsored by Kennedy Stewart (New Democrat MP), opposition had grown to 42%, from 32% in an Ipsos-Reid online survey sponsored by Enbridge in December 2011. However, because their methodologies and context differed, the reported growth in opposition was difficult to substantiate. Ipsos-Reid conducted an online custom survey for Enbridge. Mustel Group included a single question on a shared-cost omnibus telephone survey, the same survey used in their political polling.

Justason Market Intelligence released a poll in March 2012 that focused on the role of tankers in this pipeline proposal. The poll found 66% of B.C. residents opposed to Enbridge's proposal to transport oil through British Columbia's inside coastal waters, including 50% who registered strong disapproval.

An April 2012 survey by Forum Research showed an increase in opposition among B.C. residents to 52% from 46% reported by Forum Research in January. In January, Forum polled 1,211 residents from across Canada; B.C. was a smaller subsample of that national poll.  In April, Forum polled 1,069 British Columbians. The B.C. sample size for the January poll was not provided.

Political issues 
The issue of the pipeline was a subject of controversy between the governments of Alberta and British Columbia, starting in 2011 when the Alberta government under Premier Alison Redford began pressuring BC to support the pipeline.  In an 8 March speech to a "conservative family reunion" hosted by Preston Manning in Ottawa, BC Premier Christy Clark stated that "we support pipelines in British Columbia" (referring to liquid natural gas) but that she was not yet convinced of the benefits of the Northern Gateway scheme.

Following the Kalamazoo River oil spill on Enbridge Pipeline 6B in Michigan, the BC government stated five requirements to be addressed prior to supporting any heavy oil pipeline proposal:

 Successful completion of the environmental review process. In the case of Enbridge, that would mean a recommendation by the National Energy Board Joint Review Panel that the project proceed;
 World-leading marine oil spill response, prevention and recovery systems for B.C.’s coastline and ocean to manage and mitigate the risks and costs of heavy oil pipelines and shipments;
 World-leading practices for land oil spill prevention, response and recovery systems to manage and mitigate the risks and costs of heavy oil pipelines;
 Legal requirements regarding Aboriginal and treaty rights are addressed, and First Nations are provided with the opportunities, information and resources necessary to participate in and benefit from a heavy-oil project; and,
 British Columbia receives a fair share of the fiscal and economic benefits of a proposed heavy oil project that reflects the level, degree and nature of the risk borne by the province, the environment and taxpayers.

BC premier Christy Clark in 2012 boycotted a national energy strategy among the Canadian premiers stating "until we see some progress in the discussions between British Columbia, Alberta and the federal government with respect to the Gateway pipeline through British Columbia, we will not be participating in the discussion of a national energy strategy." This was likely over concerns that BC would receive a $6.1 billion share of a project that was expected to earn $81 billion in government revenues over 30 years, while footing a majority of the risk.

In July 2012 Clark said no to the proposed pipeline, unless Alberta entered negotiations with BC on revenue sharing. "If Alberta is not willing to even sit down and talk, then it stops here," she said. This is in response to the disproportionate risk that BC would have to take on with this pipeline.

See also
 Alberta Clipper pipeline
 Coastal GasLink Pipeline
 Enbridge Pipeline System
 Heiltsuk
 Trans Mountain Pipeline
 Eagle Spirit Pipeline
 On the Line (2011 film)

References

External links
 Proposed Enbridge Northern Gateway Pipeline 
 Opposition to the Northern Gateway Pipeline

Oil pipelines in Canada
Northern Gateway
Proposed pipelines in Canada
Politics of British Columbia
Politics of Alberta
2010s in Canada